Kaouther is a given name. Notable people with the name include:

Kaouther Adimi (born 1986), Algerian writer
Kaouther Ben Hania (born 1977), Tunisian film director

Human name disambiguation pages